María Rebeca (born María Rebeca Zepeda Lozano on March 9, 1970, in Mexico City, D.F., Mexico) is a Mexican actress.

Filmography

References

External links

1970 births
Living people
Mexican child actresses
Mexican telenovela actresses
Mexican television actresses
Mexican film actresses
Mexican stage actresses
Alonso
20th-century Mexican actresses
21st-century Mexican actresses
People from Mexico City